Leteči mački is a novel by Slovenian author Dim Zupan. It was first published in 1997.

See also
List of Slovenian novels

Slovenian novels
1997 novels